Dr. Herbert W. Schooling (November 5, 1912 – April 1987) was an American educator and former chancellor of the University of Missouri in Columbia, Missouri.  He is the 16th chief executive officer of the Columbia campus and second since the creation of the University of Missouri System.  Before becoming chancellor Schooling served as dean of faculties and Dean of the college of education.  During his tenure the Hearnes Center was constructed.

See also
History of the University of Missouri

References

External links
Records relating to Schooling's presidency from the MU Archives

Leaders of the University of Missouri
People from Columbia, Missouri
University of Missouri faculty
1912 births
1987 deaths
20th-century American academics